This is a list of former mosques in Spain. It lists former Muslim mosques (Arabic: Masjid, Spanish: Mezquita) and Islamic places of worship that were located within the modern borders of Spain. Most of these mosques are from the Al-Andalus period. For a list of open, functioning mosques in Spain see list of mosques in Spain.

The term former mosque in this list includes any Muslim mosque (building) or site used for Islamic Prayer (Salah) in Al-Andalus but is not so any longer.

These former mosques were used as Muslim places of worship during the Al-Andalus period from 711 AD to 1492 AD when various Muslim Moorish kingdoms ruled parts of the Iberian Peninsula. Most of these former mosques and religious buildings were either converted into churches or demolished after the Christian reconquest of the Iberian Peninsula (the Reconquista).

History
Mosques were an integral part of Al-Andalus social, political and cultural spheres. With the exception of the remnants of the 10th century Great Mosque of Cordoba, there is very little documentation available in English language about these old historical mosques.

There are only estimates about the number of these mosques. However, there seem to have existed possibly thousands of mosques in Muslim Spain. According to one estimate, there were 3,000 mosques, baths and palaces in Cordoba alone. This was during the 10th century, when Cordoba was one of the largest cities in the world and had over 250,000 buildings spread across an area of twenty four miles long and six miles wide. Today these old mosques in Cordoba are lost without a trace with the exception of the Great Mosque of Cordoba and a few other ruins and remains like the Minaret of San Juan.

At one time there were 137 mosques in the Medina of Grenada when it was the capital city of the Emirate of Granada (1230-1492). During this period the Medina (city) of Granada was one of the largest cities in Europe and welcomed large number of Muslims seeking refuge after being expelled from the Christian controlled areas. This influx doubled its size, and by 1450 made Granada the largest city in Europe in terms of population.

The proliferation of mosques was not limited to large cities. Small cities and towns had multiple mosques built for the easy and quick access of the faithful to perform their daily five times Islamic prayers (Salah) in congregation. There were 18 mosques in Jerez city, of which only the mosque within the fortress of Alcazar of Jerez de la Frontera survives today. There were 16 mosques in Vélez-Málaga (then known as Ballis Medina) during the Nazari Granada Emirate period. Ronda a smaller town had 7 or 8 mosques of which today only a minaret tower of a medium-size mosque remains. About 5 former mosques still exist in Toledo with the original structures at least partially preserved, as shown in the list below.

List of mosques in Al-Andalus (with original buildings & ruins)
This table lists former mosques in Al-Andalus with identified original buildings or ruins of the former mosque still existing on the premises.

Note: Mesquita means mosque in the Spanish language.

List of former mosques in Al-Andalus (with original buildings destroyed)
This table lists former mosques in Al-Andalus with no known surviving mosque buildings. The original mosques were completely destroyed by people, war or by natural causes like earthquakes. Other structures were built on the site destroying or covering traces of the mosque. The ruins and stone materials of the mosque were often reused to build the new structures. However these sites may still contain undiscovered original structures within the current buildings or un-excavated ruins on the premises.

See also
 Islam in Spain
 Umayyad conquest of Hispania
 Reconquista
 List of mosques in Spain
 List of former mosques in Portugal
 List of the oldest mosques in the world

References 

 
Mosques, former